Hiltruper See is a lake in Münsterland, North Rhine-Westphalia, Germany. At an elevation of 58 m, its surface area is 15.8 ha. See the German page for more information.

References

Lakes of North Rhine-Westphalia